Aylacostoma is a genus of tropical freshwater snails with an operculum, aquatic gastropod molluscs in the family Hemisinidae. They are found in South and Central America. As a consequence of the Yacyretá Dam, two species are entirely extinct and another is extinct in the wild.

Species
Species within genus Aylacostoma include:
 Aylacostoma brunneum Vogler & Peso, 2014
 Aylacostoma chloroticum Hylton-Scot, 1953
 Aylacostoma ci Simone, 2001
 Aylacostoma exoplicatum Simone, 2001 
 Aylacostoma francanum (Ihering, 1909)
 Aylacostoma glabrum Spix, 1827
 Aylacostoma guaraniticum Hylton-Scot, 1953
 Aylacostoma osculati (Villa, 1857) - synonym: Hemisinus osculati
 Aylacostoma stigmaticum Hylton-Scot, 1953
 Aylacostoma tenuilabris (Reeve, 1860)

Distribution
The native distribution of this genus includes Central and South America.

Life habits
Some species in this genus used to live in areas of white water in the Yacyretá Rapids, Paraná River, feeding on the algae that grow attached to the rocks on the bottom. The water in the area is saturated with oxygen, from the fast-moving waters.

Aylacostoma is a parthenogenic species: the population consists of only females, which increase in number by asexual reproduction. The females give birth to a small number of larvae, no more than three, that are born very well developed, so they have the physical strength needed to attach to a rock and resist the strong current.

Conservation status
With the building in 1993 of the Yacyretá Dam, almost all the suitable habitat for Aylacostoma living in this region was flooded. Consequently, A. guaraniticum and A. stigmaticum became entirely extinct, A. brunneum extinct in the wild (survives in captivity), and A. chloroticum restricted to single small wild population and a captive "safety" population. The captive populations of the last two species are jointly managed by the National University of Misiones and Bernardino Rivadavia Natural Sciences Museum.

References

External links 

 Simone L. R. L. (2006). Land and freshwater molluscs of Brazil: an illustrated inventory on the Brazilian malacofauna, including neighbour regions of the South America, respect to the terrestrial and freshwater ecosystems. São Paulo: FAPESP, 390 pp.

Hemisinidae
Taxonomy articles created by Polbot